Shannon Cunneen (born 2 March 1977 in Orange, New South Wales) is an Australian former cricket player.

She played 41 Women's National Cricket League games for the New South Wales Breakers.

Cunneen represented the Australia national women's cricket team in four One Day Internationals. She was the 100th woman to play One Day International cricket for Australia.

References

External links
 Shannon Cunneen at southernstars.org.au

Living people
1977 births
Australia women One Day International cricketers
People from Orange, New South Wales
Cricketers from New South Wales